Dialysis Clinic, Inc. is a nonprofit medical corporation founded in 1971 and chartered as a 501(c)(3) tax-exempt organization under IRS regulations.

It was founded for care and research of patients with kidney disease and supports activities in kidney transplant and dialysis across the US. It is headquartered in Nashville, Tennessee.

History

Inception 

Dialysis Clinic, Inc. (DCI) was founded in 1971 by Dr. Keith Johnson.

In December 1970, things were beginning to take shape. Upon incorporation, the decision had to be made whether DCI would be for-profit or nonprofit. Dr. Johnson and his team unanimously decided on the non-profit status and also determined that any excess revenues generated would be used for research and education in the field of kidney disease or in other ways that would benefit people with kidney disease. Just five months later, in April 1971, Dialysis Clinic, Incorporated, was established, a location was secured for the first clinic, negotiations were held with the hospital to move the patients over to the new facility, and patients began dialyzing.
 
The first DCI clinic was housed in a 1,000 square foot, refurbished home on 21st Avenue in Nashville, Tennessee. In 1971, with DCI’s first clinic already operating, there was no Medicare funding and most patients still did not have insurance to cover the cost of treatment. Dr. Johnson and his staff asked Kentucky Fried Chicken for KFC buckets to collect donations. Then the staff placed pictures of patients on their red and white buckets. On Saturday and Sunday afternoons, the staff made their way to the busiest intersections in Nashville. On a good weekend, they could raise $10,000 to help pay for treatments, but it would only last for so long and then they would be out conducting road blocks again. In 1973, the Medicare ESRD Program began, and thousands of dialysis patients across the U.S. were able to receive treatment that was and still is paid for by that program.

In 2016 

In 2016, DCI operated more than 235 dialysis clinics, not including the acute facilities within hospitals. It is the fourth largest dialysis provider in the US. DCI employed more than 5,000 people and served more than 15,000 patients across 28 states. DCI is the only leading dialysis provider to have remained under its own control since its founding. It has successfully remained non-profit and has had the lowest standard mortality rates and standard hospitalization rates among large dialysis providers for the past 13 years. DCI today operates under the mission: "We are a Non-Profit Service Organization. The Care of the Patient is Our Reason for Existence."

DCI Donor Services 
Facilitating kidney and other organ and tissue donation was the logical next step in the vertical integration of DCI as the comprehensive care provider for those in need of organ and tissue transplants. To accomplish this purpose, DCI established DCI Donor Services (DCIDS) as an independent nonprofit company. In 2016, it operated three organ procurement organizations: Tennessee Donor Services, New Mexico Donor Services, and Sierra Donor Services, in California, and one tissue bank: DCI Donor Services Tissue Bank.

DCI Laboratory  
DCI Laboratory, founded in 1988 as a division of Dialysis Clinic, Inc., is a laboratory responding specifically to the needs of dialysis patients. DCI's laboratory division was established in response to nephrologists’ request for personnel and instrumentation in tune with the dialysis community. DCI Laboratory provides services and testing technologies for health care providers and their ESRD patients, including:
 Clinical Chemistry
 Hematology
 Immunochemistry
 LAL (Endotoxin) Testing
 Water Analysis
 Dialysate and Water Cultures
 Dialysate Chemistries
 HIV Testing
 Serum Aluminum and Zinc
 On-line Data Transmission
 Lab Petri dishes

Office of Clinical Research  
DCI’s Office of Clinical Research was established in 2007 to review all studies (industry or investigator-initiated) being proposed to be conducted in DCI facilities to ensure the research is scientifically rigorous and valid and that the appropriate procedures for human protections are being followed. In 2016, the Office of Clinical Research now played a major role in facilitating multisite projects through identifying and confirming participation from the clinics and investigators that are best suited to a particular project, preparing budgets and IRB documents, orchestrating data transfers from the Medical Information System (MIS) and serving as a liaison between study Sponsors, individual investigators/research sites, and the dialysis staff.

References

External links
 
 Company profile

Renal dialysis organizations in the United States
Medical and health organizations based in Tennessee
Organizations established in 1971
1971 establishments in Tennessee